Vytautas Merkys (5 May 1929 in Čivai, near Kupiškis – 25 July 2012) was a Lithuanian historian and a professor at Vilnius University.

Biography 

Vytautas Merkys graduated from Vilnius University's department of history and philology in 1951. In 1952 he began working at the Lithuanian SSR Institute of History, but for ideological reasons he was soon fired, along with Mečislovas Jučas. He returned to the Institute in 1953 as a fellow.

He initiated his candidacy for a doctorate of philosophy degree in 1957 with the thesis Revoliucinis Vilniaus miesto darbininkų judėjimas 1895–1904 m. (The Revolutionary Movement of Vilnius City Workers from 1895 to 1904), and in 1969 he was awarded a doctorate (the Soviet equivalent of habilitation) for his dissertation Lietuvos pramonės augimas ir proletariato formavimasis XIX amžiuje (The Growth of Lithuanian Industry and the Formation of the Proletariat in the 19th Century).

In 1986 he left the Institute and was designated head of the Department of Economic History at the Lithuanian SSR Academy of Sciences. He returned to the Institute of History in 1987 and became its director. Between 1992 and 2000 he was a senior fellow there. Vytautas Merkys has been a professor at Vilnius University since 1991, and was a professor at Vytautas Magnus University from 1993 to 2000. In 1990 he was elected to the Lithuanian Academy of Sciences, and since 2001 he has been a member of the Lithuanian Catholic Academy of Sciences.

Vytautas Merkys received the Lithuanian presidential award, Order of the Lithuanian Grand Duke Gediminas, third class, in 1995.

Awards and recognition 
 Order of the Lithuanian Grand Duke Gediminas, Third Class, 1995
 Lithuanian science award, 1997, for fundamental work on the Lithuanian book smuggling movement between 1864-1904

Important works 

Vytautas Merkys' principal works focus on Lithuanian 19th-century and early 20th century history, especially the Lithuanian national revival, the Lithuanian book smuggling movement during the ban on the Lithuanian press, the work of the 19th-century historian Simonas Daukantas, and the life of the 19th-century bishop Motiejus Valančius.
 
 V. Merkys, Vilniaus darbininkų revoliucinis judėjimas 1905–1907 m. išvakarėse, Vilnius, 1957.V. Merkys, Lietuvos valstiečių ir žemės ūkio darbininkų judėjimas 1901–1904 m., Vilnius, 1959.
 V. Merkys, Liudvikas Janavičius, Vilnius: Vaga, 1964.
 V. Merkys, Narodnikai ir pirmieji marksistai Lietuvoje, Vilnius: Mintis, 1967.
 V. Merkys, Dalevskių šeima, Vilnius: Vaga, 1967.
 J. Jurginis, V. Merkys, A. Tautavičius, Vilniaus miesto istorija nuo seniausių laikų iki Spalio revoliucijos, Vilnius: Mintis, 1968, (Lietuvos SSR valstybinė premija, 1969).
 В. Меркис, Развитие промышленности и формирование пролетариата в Литве в XIX в., Вильнюс: Минтис, 1969.
 M. Valančius, Raštai, t. 2: Žemaičių vyskupystė, parengė V. Merkys, Vilnius, 1972.
 S. Daukantas, Raštai, t. 1–2, sudarė V. Merkys, Vilnius, 1976.
 V. Merkys, Nelegalioji lietuvių spauda kapitalizmo laikotarpiu (ligi 1904 m.). Politinės jos susikūrimo aplinkybės, Vilnius: Mokslas, 1978.
 V. Merkys, Lietuvos valstiečiai ir spauda XIX a. pabaigoje – XX a. pradžioje, Vilnius, 1982.
 Lietuvos TSR istorija, t. 1 Nuo seniausių laikų iki 1917 metų, red. kol. B. Vaitkevičius, M. Jučas, V. Merkys, Vilnius: Mokslas, 1985.
 V. Merkys, L. Mulevičius, R. Vėbra, E. Vidmantas, Lietuvių nacionalinio išsivadavimo judėjimas /ligi 1904 m./, Vilnius: Mokslas, 1987.
 M. Jučas, I. Lukšaitė, V. Merkys, Lietuvos istorija: Nuo seniausių laikų iki 1917 metų, Vilnius: Mokslas, 1988.
 V. Merkys, Simonas Daukantas, 2 papild. leid., Vilnius: Vyturys, 1991.
 V. Merkys, Knygnešių laikai. 1864–1904, Vilnius: Valstybinis leidybos centras, 1994.
 V. Merkys, . 1864–1904: Informacinė knyga, Vilnius: Mokslo ir enciklopedijų leidykla, 1994.
 V. Merkys, Motiejus Valančius: tarp katalikiškojo universalizmo ir tautiškumo, Vilnius: Mintis, 1999.
 V. Merkys, Tautiniai santykiai Vilniaus vyskupijoje 1798–1918 m.: Vilnius: Versus Aureus, 2006.

Footnotes

References
 Short biography. Vytautas Merkys. The Lithuanian Word. Retrieved on 2007-9-15.
  Short bio and bibliography retrieved on 2007-9-15.

1929 births
2012 deaths
20th-century Lithuanian historians
Historians of Lithuania
Vilnius University alumni
Academic staff of Vilnius University
Commander's Crosses of the Order of the Lithuanian Grand Duke Gediminas
Academic staff of Vytautas Magnus University
People from Kupiškis District Municipality